Alatorka (Alator) is a rural locality (a selo) in Kaltymanovsky Selsoviet, Iglinsky District, Bashkortostan, Russia. The population was 718 as of 2010. There are 21 streets.

Geography 
Alatorka is located 9 km southwest of Iglino (the district's administrative centre) by road. Iglino is the nearest rural locality.

References 

Rural localities in Iglinsky District